Space is an album by American jazz group the Modern Jazz Quartet featuring performances recorded in 1969 and released on the Apple label.

Reception
The Allmusic review by Scott Yanow stated: "Overall this is an average but worthy outing from a group whose excellence could always be taken for granted".

Track listing

Side one
 "Visitor from Venus" (John Lewis) – 5:40   
 "Visitor from Mars" (John Lewis) – 7:18   
 "Here's That Rainy Day" (Jimmy Van Heusen, Johnny Burke) – 4:20

Side two
"Dilemma" (Miljenko Prohaska) – 5:48   
 "Adagio from Concierto de Aranjuez" (Joaquín Rodrigo) – 10:18

Personnel
Milt Jackson - vibraphone
John Lewis - piano
Percy Heath - double bass
Connie Kay - drums, percussion

References

Apple Records albums
Modern Jazz Quartet albums
1969 albums
Albums recorded at Trident Studios